Semenivka Raion  was a raion (district) of Chernihiv Oblast, northern Ukraine. Its administrative centre was located at the city of Semenivka. The raion was abolished on 18 July 2020 as part of the administrative reform of Ukraine, which reduced the number of raions of Chernihiv Oblast to five. The area of Semenivka Raion was merged into Novhorod-Siverskyi Raion. The last estimate of the raion population was 

At the time of disestablishment, the raion consisted of one hromada, Semenivka urban hromada with the administration in Semenivka.

References

Former raions of Chernihiv Oblast
1926 establishments in Ukraine
Ukrainian raions abolished during the 2020 administrative reform